Luke Pegler (born 1981) is an Australian actor who is known for Scott Wiper's The Condemned and Gregory Dark's See No Evil.

Career
Pegler has starred in two WWE Films productions: The Condemned with Stone Cold Steve Austin, and See No Evil with Kane. Pegler appeared as Daniel Griggs in Packed to the Rafters from 2008 to 2009. The actor joined the cast of Rescue: Special Ops in 2010 as Gary Bing. In August 2011, it was announced Pegler had joined the cast of Neighbours for six weeks as Dane Canning. Pegler took over storylines planned for Chris Milligan's character Kyle Canning, after the actor snapped an Achilles tendon. Pegler wrapped his guest stint on 23 September.

Filmography

References

External links

Male actors from Perth, Western Australia
Living people
1981 births